Jamshedpur Co-operative College, established in 1949, is one of the oldest degree college in the Jharkhand state of India. It offers undergraduate and postgraduate courses in arts, commerce, and science. It is affiliated to  Kolhan University.

Location
The college is located in the heart of Jamshedpur town in the Jharkhand state.

Departments

Science
Chemistry
Physics
Mathematics
Botany
Zoology
Statistics
Geology

Arts and Commerce

Bengali
Hindi
English
History
Oriya
Urdu
Political Science
Economics
Philosophy
Education
Commerce

See also
Education in India
Literacy in India
List of institutions of higher education in Jharkhand

References

External links
 http://www.cooperativecollegejsr.ac.in/

Colleges affiliated to Kolhan University
Educational institutions established in 1949
Universities and colleges in Jharkhand
Education in Jamshedpur
1949 establishments in India